Mullumbimby is an Australian town in the Byron Shire in the Northern Rivers region of New South Wales. It promotes itself as "The Biggest Little Town in Australia". The town lies at the foot of Mount Chincogan in the Brunswick Valley about 9 kilometres (5.5 miles) by road from the coast.

History of Mullumbimby
Bundjalung people were the first people who lived in the area of Mullumbimby before the arrival of Europeans. The first Europeans to discover the area was Captain Henry Rous in 1828.

Origins and name

Mullumbimby and surrounds is located on unceded land of the Bundjalung Nation. In the 1850s Europeans had established a camp site at the junction of two arms of the Brunswick River. This grew to become a village and later the township of Mullumbimby. Mullumbimby was originally a centre for the timber industry. Notably, red cedar was collected in great quantities from around the area, a part of the far northern New South Wales' "Big Scrub".

The town was a logical site for settlement by the timber hunters, as the Brunswick River is tidal in the town and navigable to that point, allowing logs to be floated down the river to its mouth at Brunswick Heads. The town's central location gave access to most of the catchment area, and it provided the best position for bullock teams to cross the river with their wagons loaded with timber. At low tide it is still possible to see the shallow region where the bullocks made the crossing of the Brunswick River, under the current "Federation Bridge" on Murwillumbah Road.

The name "Mullumbimby", meaning "small round hill", was given to the district by Aboriginal people. The name is derived from the Bandjalung-Yugambeh dialect mulubinba (possibly also pertaining to a native fern which grew in the vicinity). Although some sources claim this is because of the proximity of Mount Chincogan, Chincogan is probably too prominent in the landscape to fit the name. An alternative theory is that it refers to another smaller and rounder hill. Suggestions include a medium hill to the north of Left Bank road, on which the towns water tower is located, or a smaller hill on Coolamon Scenic Drive, situated on the Daly Family Farm, near the current golf course. This latter hill is possibly supported by the abundant grass flats which surrounded it, known as Mullumbimby Grass. These naturally open grass flats, presumably hunting grounds for the local Bundjalung tribes, were later used by early European timber hunters to graze their bullock teams. The significance of this area lay not only in the feed it provided, but that some grasses in the naturally cleared area aided bullocks which had swallowed salt water when dragging timber into the surf for collection by nearby ships.

Cultural history

Mullumbimby was a separate municipality from 1908 until 1980 when it was forced to amalgamate with the Byron Shire. The Byron Shire Council offices were relocated to Mullumbimby in the 1990s.

Byron Shire, including Mullumbimby and nearby Byron Bay, became a center of alternative or counter culture alongside the extant mainstream culture in the 1970s and 1980s, and remains so today. The male choir Dustyesky performs Russian-language folk songs and received major coverage on the Russian television broadcaster Channel One.

Once the most notable specimens of the valuable timber trees had been collected (most notably red cedar, but also Australian Teak, Hoop Pine, Rosewood, Silky Oak and Black and Red Bean), the Big Scrub timber trade collapsed and Mullumbimby became primarily a farming community. Like many areas of the Big Scrub, allotments were given in Mullumbimby and the surrounding areas by the New South Wales government on the condition that the owner cleared the land for agricultural use. Beef and dairy, along with bananas and sugar cane have traditionally been the notable products of the area. However, the subdivision of many of the larger farms and the emergence of numerous small scale farmers has led to a higher diversity of products. A weekly farmers' market has been developed to exhibit local produce.

A static inverter plant of HVDC Directlink is located at Laverty's Gap near Mullumbimby. This inverter plant was previously the site of a 288 kW hydroelectric power scheme that powered Mullumbimby, Byron Bay and Bangalow from 1926, using water from a weir in nearby Wilsons Creek. The scheme was the fourth hydro electric power station in NSW and only the fifth on mainland Australia. Powering Mullumbimby for the first time in 1925, the scheme made Mullumbimby one of the first country towns in NSW to receive electricity. Although decommissioned in 1990, it is now of state heritage significance. The hydroelectric scheme was designed by William Corin (1867–1929). The site is being considered for pumped-storage hydroelectricity.

Mullumbimby Star was a newspaper published in the town.

Heritage listings
Mullumbimby has several heritage-listed sites and the controversial Slater mounds have been nominated as local heritage. The best known heritage sites include:
 Wilsons Creek Road: Mullumbimby Hydro-electric Power Station Complex

Population
In the 2016 Census, there were 3,596 people in Mullumbimby. 70.2% of people were born in Australia. The next most common country of birth was England at 5.9%. 82.9% of people spoke only English at home. The most common response for religion was No Religion at 45.3%. Aboriginal and/or Torres Strait Islander people made up 1.9% of the population in 2016. English, Australian, Irish, Scottish and German are the most common ancestries.

Geography

The line opened in 1894 and was closed in 2004 because of an argument over funding between federal and state politicians, despite community resistance across the region. Closure of the railway line between Murwillumbah and Casino has reduced transport options in the region.

The Brunswick River starts in Mullumbimby, at the meeting of Main Arm and Mullumbimby creeks.

Mullumbimby is close to the localities of Ocean Shores, Brunswick Heads and Wilsons Creek. Its hinterland area includes the locales of Goonengerry, Huonbrook, Koonyum Range, Main Arm, Montecollum, Palmwoods, Wanganui and Wilsons Creek and coincides with the postcode area of 2482 which has a diamond shape of around 35 km by 45 km.

The main geographical feature of Mullumbimby, Mount Chincogan, was a minor lava plug of the now extinct Tweed shield volcano. The nearby Mount Warning was the main plug.

Stone arrangement

Reported stones arrangement on the Slater mounds on the western side of Saddle Ridge is thought by some to date back to the Paleolithic Age, and pre-dates Stonehenge. The arrangements were communicated in the late 1930s by the Brunswick Heads headmaster to Mr Frederic Slater who attempted to make headlines across Australia with this as a highly significant Aboriginal site.  Slater and some other researchers believe the inscriptions on the stones contain the earliest form of human language.  Others regard this as pure pseudoscience.  There is claimed to have been intentional destruction of the site and the 1930s-described stones have disappeared.

Health

Mullumbimby is a hot spot for the anti-vaccination movement. As of 2013, the towns vaccination rate was the lowest in Australia, with only 46% to 49% of children aged one, two and five years old  in the 2482 postcode fully immunised, in contrast with a state average in the low 90s. In Mullumbimby, between 2015 and 2016 only 52% of five year olds were fully vaccinated, compared to the national average at the time of 92.9%. Richmond Valley, a region close to Mullumbimby, had the lowest overall vaccination rate, in part due to a high number of "conscientious objectors" to the practice. Health officials have cited education and timely reminders as key factors in improving the vaccination rate.

The Byron Shire, in which Mullumbimby is situated, is also the only remaining local government area in the Northern Rivers region to reject fluoridation of its water supply.

Sport and recreation

The Mullumbimby Giants is the local rugby league club that competes in the Northern Rivers Regional Rugby League competition.

Notable people

Vic Armbruster, Australian rugby league player (1902–1984)
Iggy Azalea, Grammy-nominated multi-platinum selling rapper, songwriter and model (born 1990); her stage name was partially inspired by Mullumbimby's Azalea Street, where her childhood home was located
Bob Bellear, first Aboriginal judge in Australia (1944–2005)
Renee Bargh, Australian TV presenter (born 1986)
Doug Deitz, rugby league player (1914–1994)
Jy Hitchcox, rugby league player (born 1989)
Trent Knobel, AFL player with Brisbane Bears and St Kilda Football Club (born 1980)
Cody Nelson, rugby league player (born 1988)
Audrey Oldfield, children's writer (1925–2010)
Amy Taylor, lead singer Amyl and the Sniffers (born 1979)
Petria Thomas, swimming Olympic gold medallist (born 1975)
Joel Turner, beatboxer, singer, songwriter, instrumentalist and record producer (born 1987)
Edwin Wilson, author of Mullumbimby Dreaming and The Mullumbimby Kid (1942–2022)
Mark Lewis, filmmaker

See also 

 Mullumbimby (novel)
 Shearwater, The Mullumbimby Steiner School
 List of towns in Australia
 2022 eastern Australia floods

References

External links

 

Towns in New South Wales
Northern Rivers
Byron Shire